Francisco P. Moya (born January 9, 1974) is an American politician from Corona, Queens. He has served in the New York City Council from the 21st district since 2018. He served in the New York State Assembly from the 39th district from 2011 to 2017. He is a member of the Democratic Party.

Early life and education
Moya has a B.A. degree in Asian Studies from St. John's University and a Master of Public Administration degree from Baruch College.

Moya says he is the first state legislator of Ecuadorian descent, as he was elected to the New York State Assembly in 2010.

Career
Moya's political background includes stints as an aide to Congresswoman Nydia Velazquez and to then-State Senator David Paterson. He has worked in public affairs for Cablevision and was formerly a director of business development at Elmhurst Hospital Center.

In September 2010, Moya was named one of The Capitol's "40 under 40".

New York State Assembly
Moya won a September 2010 primary election for State Assembly, defeating former State Senator Hiram Monseratte. Moya ran unopposed in the November 2010 general election for the 39th Assembly District in Queens, New York.

New York City Council
In 2017, Moya ran for New York City Council. His Democratic primary opponent was Hiram Monserrate, who had been defeated by Moya in a 2010 Democratic Assembly primary. Moya defeated Monseratte in the 2017 Democratic primary with 55% of the vote. In the general election, Moya was the only candidate and thus won election to the City Council.

Moya serves on the following New York City Council committees:

 Cultural Affairs, Libraries, and International Intergroup Relations
 Finance

 Land Use
 Zoning and Franchises (He serves as chair of this subcommittee.)
 Parks and Recreation
 For-Hire Vehicles
 Hospitals

References

External links
 Official biography at the New York State Assembly website

1974 births
Living people
American politicians of Ecuadorian descent
Democratic Party members of the New York State Assembly
New York City Council members
Hispanic and Latino American New York City Council members
People from Queens, New York
St. John's University (New York City) alumni
21st-century American politicians